Route 432, also known as Main Brook Highway, is a  east-west highway on the Great Northern Peninsula of Newfoundland in the Canadian Province of Newfoundland and Labrador. It connects the towns of Roddickton, Bide Arm, Main Brook, along with many other smaller communities, with Route 430 (Great Northern Peninsula Highway/Viking Trail) and the town of St. Anthony. Route 432 also carries the designation The Grenfell Loop after the Grenfell Mission founded by Sir Wilfred Grenfell.

Route description

Route 432 begins at an intersection with Route 430 in Plum Point and winds its way east through wooded, hilly, and rural terrain for several kilometres. The highway has an intersection with Route 433 (Englee Highway) just north of Roddickton before winding its way northeast to have an intersection with Route 438 (Croque Road) and passing through Main Brook. Route 432 continues northward through rural areas for several kilometres before coming to an end at another intersection with Route 430 at the St. Anthony Airport.

Major intersections

References

432